Hong Kyung-min (born February 9, 1976) is a South Korean singer and actor. As a singer, Hong has released 10 albums and is best known for his 2000 hit song "Shaky Friendship".

Music career

1997–2000 
He made his debut as a rock-ballad singer in 1997 with the song "Now" ("이제는"). Hong Kyung Min's style of rock was much unlike any other rock singer. Different from rock singers with loud high-pitched tones, Hong Kyung Min's mid-to-low voice color and stable tone approached listeners with a more comforting sensation.

Although he was acknowledged as a talented singer with his strong husky voice appealing to many music lovers, his place in the pop music market was not significant. However, in 2000, the single "Shaky Friendship" ("흔들린 우정") was released from his third album and became a strong success. The single's release marked a change of style, as Hong broke away from his previous rock-styled songs and moved into the Latin music genre. His third album was a strong success and the best-selling album of Hong's career, with 280,422 copies sold in its release year. As his new style of music continued to increase his popularity, Hong Kyung Min was nicknamed affectionately as "Korea's Ricky Martin".

2001–2002 
Hong Kyung Min's success continued on into 2001, as he released his fourth album, with the hit track "Take It" ("가져가"), a single that blended rock and dance music. His fifth album, Forever and A Day, saw a brief return to his pop ballad roots with the title track "After" ("후").

2002 marked the five-year milestone in Hong Kyung Min's career. To celebrate he released a two disc compilation entitled The Hong Kyung Min Best 1997–2002 History which featured a new disco themed track "Her Charm" ("그녀의 매력"). One disc dubbed "Passion" showcased upbeat dance tracks, while the other disc ("Mood") contained ballads, showcasing Hong's diversity as a singer.

2002 also marked Hong Kyung Min's entrance into the army, putting the singer on hiatus for the next two years.

2004–present 
Having finished full military service at the end of 2004, Hong Kyung Min returned with his sixth album, Listen and Repeat, with a hit rock song "Tonight". Also featured on this album is "To My Friend", the music video for which had appearances by Hong's real life friends Cha Tae-hyun and Kim Jong-kook.

In September 2006 the singer released his seventh album, Evolution of Rhythm, which marked Hong's return to the rock genre. With the promotion of his new album, 2006 saw an increase of guest appearances on celebrity talk and game shows. A guest appearance on SBS game show New X-Man saw Hong demonstrate his talent of imitating other singers by singing Shin Seung-hun's "I Believe" in eight different celebrity voices.

The following year marked the ten-year anniversary of Hong Kyung Min's career. On August 28, 2007 he released his eighth album Music for My Life, Life for My Music, a pop ballad album reflecting on the last decade. Close friend and composer Jo Young Soo composed the title song "Fool" ("못난이"), a ballad featuring a harmonica. The sixth track of the album, "Neighbour People, Fighting!!" ("동네 사람들, Fighting!!"), was personally composed and written by Hong Kyung Min himself.

On June 28, 2008 he released his ninth album titled Keep Going. Hong Kyung Min once again changes gears, this time putting more focus into upbeat dance tracks. The album's main track "Come Back, Come Back" ("돌아와 돌아와") features hip-hop duo Mighty Mouth. This marks the first time in six years that Hong Kyung Min has released a dance song as the lead single of his album.

Acting career 
In July 2002 Hong made his film debut, starring as himself in the lead role of the satirical comedy Emergency Act 19 (긴급조치 19호). While the film featured many Korean entertainers as guests, the film received largely negative reviews. During an appearance on New X-Man, Hong mentioned the film as something that he was embarrassed about, but remarked that it was hard not to watch it simply because it was so bad.

Hong eventually moved onto dramas, as he starred opposite actress Lee Young-ah on the MBC romantic comedy series Love Can't Wait (사랑은 아무도 못말려) which aired from January 2, 2006 to June 30, 2006.  He then starred in Fugitive, Lee Doo-young (도망자 이두용), a KBS2 miniseries which ran from September 27, 2006 to October 5, 2006.

In 2007, he had a supporting role in the SBS Drama The Person I Love (사랑하는 사람아). Starring opposite Kim Dong-wan and Han Eun-jung, the series aired from January 5, 2007 to March 27, 2007. In the same year, Hong debuted in Japan with the film 26 Years Diary (あなたを忘れない). The film was released simultaneously in both Japan and Korea. He also performed a song on the movie's soundtrack in both Korean and Japanese languages. The Korean version being penned by Hong himself.

Personal life
In 2014 Hong married award-winning gugak musician Kim Yu-na, who specializes in the haegeum. The couple first met on the set of Immortal Songs: Singing the Legend when she was one of the musicians accompanying him. They have two daughters Ra-won (born 2016) and Ra-im (born 2019). Hong and his daughters are cast members of the reality show The Return of Superman.

Discography

Studio albums

Compilations albums

Remake albums

Feature Album

Digital singles

Filmography

Film 
 2002: Emergency Act 19
 2007: 26 Years Diary
 2017: Because I Love You

Television drama

Variety show

Radio show

Awards and nominations

References

External links 

 
 Hong Kyung-Min biography at KBS World

K-pop singers
South Korean pop rock singers
South Korean dance musicians
South Korean male film actors
South Korean male television actors
South Korean television personalities
1976 births
Living people
People from Seoul
21st-century South Korean  male singers